Blue rose is a colored flower.

Blue Rose may refer to:

 Blue Rose (album), a 1956 album by Rosemary Clooney, accompanied by the Duke Ellington orchestra
 "Blue Rose" (song), a 1994 song by Shizuka Kudō
 The Blue Rose, a 2012 investigative television drama produced by South Pacific Pictures in New Zealand
 Blue Rose (art group), a symbolist artist association in Moscow from 1906 to 1908
 Blue Rose (band), an all-female bluegrass music band
 UK folk musician Laura Groves, who formerly recorded as Blue Roses
 Blue Roses (Rachael Sage album), 2014
 Blue Roses (Runaway June album), 2019
 Blue Rose (role-playing game), a role-playing game
 Blue Rose, song by Duke Ellington
 The Blue Rose Trilogy by Peter Straub, consisting of the novels Koko, Mystery, and The Throat
 The Blue Rose, a psychedelic poster for a Grateful Dead concert in 1979
 Blue Rose rice, a Louisiana cultivar that was later developed into Calrose rice.
 Supreme: Blue Rose, a comic book miniseries by Warren Ellis.